A snowball is a ball of snow, usually made by compacting snow with the hands.

Snowball may also refer to:

Business and finance
 Snowball (finance), an "exotic" interest rate derivative
 The debt-snowball method, a debt reduction strategy

Drugs
 Snowball, another name for a cocaine-heroin speedball
 Snowball, a cocaine party

Food and drink
 Snowball (cocktail), an alcoholic mixed drink
 An alternate name for snow cone; a treat of shaved ice & sugar syrup
Sno-ball, New Orleans version of the snow cone 
 Sno Balls, Hostess-brand confection
 Tunnock's Snowball, a British sweet snack

Media, arts, and entertainment

Dances
 Snowball (school dance), a regional U.S. term for a type of school dance where females invite males (similar to a Sadie Hawkins dance)

Film
 Snowball (1960 film), a British crime film
 Snowball (1995 film), an Italian family adventure film
 Snowball (2020 film), a South Korean drama film

 Private Snowball, a nickname given to an African-American recruit in the film Full Metal Jacket (1987)
 Snowball, the nickname of the character Willam Black from Kevin Smith's film Clerks and the Mallrats films
 Snowball, a rabbit in the animated film The Secret Life of Pets

Games
 Snowball (1983), a text adventure in the Silicon Dreams trilogy by Level 9 Computing

Literature and publications
 The Snowball (children's novel), a children's fantasy novel by Barbara Sleigh
 Snowball (Animal Farm), a character in George Orwell's political satire Animal Farm
 The Snowball: Warren Buffett and the Business of Life, a book about Warren Buffett written by Alice Schroeder

Music
 Snowball (album), 1989 debut mini-album by The Field Mice
 "Snowball", a song on Devo's album Freedom of Choice

People
 Bertie Snowball (1887–1915), English golfer
 Betty Snowball (1908–1988), English cricketer
 Cilla Snowball (born 1958), British executive
 Jabez Bunting Snowball (1837–1907), Canadian businessman
 Oswald Snowball (1859–1928), Australian politician
 Ray Snowball (born 1932), English footballer
 William Bunting Snowball (1865–1925), Canadian politician

Places
 Snowball, Arkansas, an unincorporated community in Arkansas, United States
 Snowball, Minnesota, an unincorporated community in Minnesota, United States
 Snowball, Ontario, a hamlet in Ontario, Canada

Plants
Abronia fragrans, prairie snowball
Mammilloydia, snowball cactus
Styrax hemsleyanus, Hemsley snowball
Viburnum × carlcephalum, fragrant snowball
Viburnum macrocephalum, snowball bush
Viburnum opulus, snowball tree
Viburnum plicatum, Japanese snowball

Television
 Snowball (The Simpsons), a cat character in The Simpsons
 Snowball, a gene-spliced intelligent hamster who is a recurring character in the cartoon Pinky and the Brain

Technology
 Snowball programming language, computing
 Snowball (single-board computer), from ST-Ericsson
 Snowball (microcontroller), a microcontroller used in education
 Snowball (storage device), a portable storage device from Amazon Web Services

Other uses
 Snowball (cockatoo), an Eleonora cockatoo demonstrated to be capable of beat induction
 A codename for the 1954 Soviet Totskoye nuclear exercise

See also
 SNOBOL (programming language)
 Snowballing (disambiguation)
 
 Snow cone

Technology and engineering disambiguation pages